Frank Edgar Richard Whitten (15 November 1942 – 12 February 2011) was a New Zealand television actor. He was more recently known for playing Ted "Grandpa" West in the New Zealand television show Outrageous Fortune.

Early life and education
Whitten was born in Te Aroha and grew up in the Waikato region in the 1940s and 50s. Around 1963, "with very little experience and even less money", he left for England to become an actor. He also spent time as an improvisational tutor at leading British drama school the London Academy of Music and Dramatic Art, and by 1970 was the school's vice-principal. Over the next eighteen years, Whitten worked in a children's community theatre company he co-founded called Common Stock, which developed plays with, and for, working-class children.

Career
In 1982 Whitten returned to New Zealand and began acting in theatre. Two years later, he appeared as an exploitative guru of a commune in Trespasses, the movie spin off of police show Mortimer's Patch. The same year, Whitten played the enigmatic farmer who strides into the isolated rural world of a young child in Vigil, the first feature directed by Vincent Ward. In the mid-1980s he joined the serial Heroes, playing roadie to a group of young musicians. He followed this role by playing one of the main roles on historical drama Heart of the High Country, based on the novel by English author Elizabeth Gowans.

Whitten had a role in the short film Accidents, and small roles in the romance Arriving Tuesday, Zilch, The Returning, and two international thrillers, Chill Factor and Hot Target. In 2003, he appeared in P.J. Hogan's live action remake of Peter Pan.

On television, he made guest appearances on Erebus: The Aftermath, Gloss, The Chosen, Ray Bradbury Theatre and Mysterious Island, and a lead role in the award-winning miniseries The Leaving of Liverpool.

In 2007, his ongoing role on as "Grandpa" Ted West on Outrageous Fortune won him a best supporting actor award at the New Zealand Screen Awards.

For twelve years, he played the older man in the Speight's "Southern Man" series of television commercials, well known for his character's catchphrase, "Good on ya, mate!"

Theatre
Whitten penned the stage drama Trifecta.

Death
Whitten died on 12 February 2011, aged 68. The official media statement stated that "[he] died peacefully in his sleep" following a short battle with cancer.

Filmography

Film

Television

References

External links
 
 Frank Whitten biography/filmography at NZ On Screen

1942 births
2011 deaths
Deaths from cancer in New Zealand
New Zealand male film actors
New Zealand male television actors
People from Te Aroha
Place of death missing